The 2008 Peak Antifreeze & Motor Oil Indy Grand Prix of Sonoma County was the fifteenth round of the 2008 IndyCar Series season. It took place on August 24, 2008.

Race 

Peak Antifreeze Indy Grand Prix
Peak Antifreeze Indy Grand Prix
Peak Antifreeze Indy Grand Prix
Indy Grand Prix of Sonoma